The 2009 New Democracy leadership election was held on 29 November 2009, following the official announcement of the resignation of Kostas Karamanlis, after more than 12 years (since 21 March 1997) as leader of New Democracy, the main centre-right political party and one of the two major parties in Greece (at that time, the other of the two major parties was PASOK, the social democratic and center-left political party).

Karamanlis announced that he would start procedures for the election of a new president on 4 October 2009, after the defeat of majority party New Democracy in the 2009 Greek legislative election, which was held on the same day.  Antonis Samaras succeeded Karamanlis as the party's leader having won 50.06 percent of the votes at first round: for this reason, no second round was required and Samaras took office on 30 November 2009 as ND party President and Leader of Opposition (against PASOK and George Papandreou's cabinet).

Results
The results of the election.

Background
In March 2004, New Democracy formed a cabinet for a first time under Kostas Karamanlis after their win in the 2004 Greek legislative election and received a fresh mandate for a second term in the untimely 2007 election. On September 2, 2009, Karamanlis called early general elections for a second time during his incumbency as Prime Minister of Greece, stressing the need for economic reform to tackle the impact of the global financial crisis on Greek economy. He also blamed main opposition PASOK for these early polls, accusing them of creating a protracted pre-election climate until next March when the members of the Hellenic Parliament were to vote for the election of the President of Greece, as PASOK had proclaimed their intention to vote against incumbent Karolos Papoulias (member of PASOK, elected in March 2005) in order to force the government to call early general election, in a period when opinion polls had been giving a victory for PASOK by a large margin.

References

New Democracy
Political party leadership elections in Greece
New Democracy (Greece)
New Democracy leadership election